You Haunt Me is the first studio album by indie pop trio Sir Sly. It was released on September 16, 2014 by Interscope Records.

Track listing

References

2014 albums
Sir Sly albums